Hambye is a commune in the Manche department in north-western France. Its inhabitants are called Hambion(ne)s or Hambyon(ne)s in French.

Heraldry

See also
Communes of the Manche department

References

Communes of Manche